Peter O'Brien is an Australian actor, best known for his role as an original cast member in 1985 of Australian soap opera Neighbours as Shane Ramsay.

Career
O'Brien played a regular role in short-lived soap opera Starting Out (1983), in then had guest roles in Carson's Law in 1983 and Prisoner in 1984 and appeared in The Henderson Kids. He was then cast as Shane Ramsey, a regular original character in soap opera Neighbours on the Seven Network in 1985. He became one of the serial's most popular cast members, continuing in the series until 1987. He then played a leading regular role in drama series The Flying Doctors from 1988 until 1991.

In 1994, O'Brien sent up his soap opera star past by taking a regular role in Psycho Ward 10, a soap opera parody in The All New Alexei Sayle Show.

O'Brien took on the role of surgical registrar Mr. Cyril "Scissors" Smedley in the popular BBC series Cardiac Arrest through the second and third series between 1995 and 1996.

He later starred in television series Queer as Folk, White Collar Blue, Hell Has Harbour Views and Gossip Girl.

O'Brien has appeared in numerous mini-series, including The Day of the Roses and Through My Eyes (the story of Lindy Chamberlain). He has also guest starred on numerous television series, including Halifax f.p.. For his work, O'Brien has won Australian Film Institute and Logie Awards. He also appeared as Carl Morgan in Spellbinder: Land of the Dragon Lord, and he appeared in the 1998 Australian/Brisbane comedy television series of Minty. In 2009 he played Sydney underworld figure and racing identity George Freeman in the series Underbelly: A Tale of Two Cities. He later reprised his role as George Freeman in the follow up in the Underbelly series the Golden Mile.

O'Brien was part of the cast of BBC Television series Casualty as a new consultant called Stitch. He also appeared in ITV police drama The Bill in which he played corrupt Detective Inspector Peter Cavanaugh.

He appeared as Ed in "The Waters of Mars", the second of the 2009 specials of Doctor Who.

In 2022, it was announced O'Brien had reprised his role of Shane Ramsay in Neighbours following the news that the serial would be concluding later that year.

Awards
O'Brien has won several acting awards in his career. He won two Logie Awards - one in 1987 for the 'Most Popular Actor' (for his role in Neighbours) and one in 2003 for the 'Most Outstanding Actor' (for his role in White Collar Blue).

Personal life
On 1 January 2003, O'Brien married actress Miranda Otto, after the two had met while performing in A Doll's House. They have one child, a daughter named Darcey, who was born on 1 April 2005.

Filmography

References

External links

 "The Day of the Roses" – includes cast biographies

20th-century Australian male actors
21st-century Australian male actors
Australian male film actors
Australian male soap opera actors
Australian people of Irish descent
Living people
Logie Award winners
Male actors from South Australia
Year of birth missing (living people)